Blue Knob (elevation ) is a summit in the eastern United States with a broad dome that is the northernmost 3,000-footer in the Allegheny Mountains. It is the highest point in Bedford County, Pennsylvania.

The mountain is the site of  Blue Knob State Park and contains approximately 18 miles (29 km) of hiking trails and numerous overlooks. An alpine ski area is located on the mountain's north slopes. The towns of Pavia and Claysburg lie at the foot of the mountain, and Johnstown, Altoona, and Bedford are located within .

Geography
The satellite peaks of Blue Knob include:
Herman Point ,
Spruce Knob ,
Round Knob ,
Cattle Knob ,
Pine Knob ,
Ritchey Knob  and
Schaefer Head .

Summits to the north include Brush Mountain (17 miles), Schaefer Head (2.5 miles) and the other satellite peaks listed above, The "Loop" in Tussey Mountain (27 miles) and Lock Mountain (13 miles).

To the east the views are of Dunning Mountain (7 miles), Tussey Mountain (16 miles), Jacks Mountain with Butler Knob (31 miles), Sideling Hill (28 miles), and on the distant horizon Big Mountain (41 miles) and the Tuscarora Mountain Ridge. To the south are Wills Mountain (32 miles), Savage Mountain (28 miles) and Bald Knob on the Allegheny Front (20 miles). The town of Bedford is hidden by Kinton Knob (18 miles).

The views west include Laurel Hill with the Conemaugh Gorge (22 miles), and the Allegheny Plateau.

Drainages
A few of the major streams are Big Lick Branch, Rhodes Run, Pavia Run, Deep Hollow Run, Scubgrass Creek, Beaverdam Creek and Little Beaverdam Creek. Bob's Creek which is in the valley below the mountain is a "Class A" trout stream and popular among local fisherman. Adjacent to the mountain on the Allegheny Front are Big Break Hollow and Wallacks Branch, portions of these streams are located within the State Park boundary.

Geology

Blue Knob and its subsidiary peaks form a grouping of mountains that stand out as a massif from the rest of the Allegheny Front and form some of the highest elevations in Pennsylvania's Allegheny Mountains. Blue Knob is separate from the rest of the Allegheny Front escarpment, and the mountain's lower base is made up of siltstone and shale of the Devonian Catskill and Devonian-Mississippian Rockwell formations. The upper slopes and summit are made up of the buff-colored Mississippian Burgoon Formation of sandstone and conglomerate, which is far more resistant to weathering than the underlying shale and siltstone.

History

In the 1950s the summit was cleared of vegetation and was the location of Claysburg Air Force Station until it was deactivated in 1961. Shortly afterward the Blue Knob Ski area was developed. Signs from the former station remain on the summit, and one building remains as a ski lodge. Ski lifts, a ski lodge and a couple of maintenance structures occupy the broad summit of Blue Knob, and a few ski chalets are downhill of the bald summit.

Climate

In December 1890 alone,  fell on the mountain. Average snowfall is about  annually, while temperatures usually are  cooler than in the surrounding towns.

Blue Knob's weather can be attributed to its aspect and elevation. The prevailing winds hit the mountain's slopes, accelerating up and over its bald summit. It is these conditions that can cause wind chill factors to dip below zero during the winter months.

Vegetation

Eastern Hemlock trees are located along streams of the mountain's lower slopes, and the drier east and southeast face of the mountain is predominantly a Red and White oak and maple mix, with grapevines and some exotic invasive species where there are holes in the canopy. The north and west faces of the mountain contain Tulip poplar, American Beech and other associated hardwoods due to the richer soils. The upper slopes of the mountain have Black Cherry, Striped Maple, Scrub Oak and a forest floor of blueberry and fern. Over the  contour the trees are distinctively stunted due to the winds and fierce weather.

In September 2004, during Hurricane Ivan, strong winds streamed through the saddle between Herman Point and Blue Knob. Many of the larger trees were blown down, opening holes in the forest canopy.

Wildlife

Wildlife is abundant on the slopes of Blue Knob. Species such as white-tailed deer, ruffed grouse, turkey, coyote, porcupine and fox are difficult to see, but finding their tracks in the snow is not uncommon. Black bears are also resident on the mountain and are more likely to be seen during the early morning and evening hours. Red-tailed hawks, warblers, vireos and songbirds are found here throughout the seasons.

Adjacent to the state park is the  Pennsylvania State Game Lands No. 26. There are a few areas in Blue Knob State Park which are closed to hunting (see park map). Hikers need to be extremely careful during the hunting season in late November and through December.

References 

Alan R. Geyer (1979) "Outstanding Geologic Features of Pennsylvania", Geological Survey of Pennsylvania
Charles H. Shultz (1999) "The Geology of Pennsylvania", Geological Survey of Pennsylvania 
Jere Martin (1997) "Pennsylvania Almanac" published by: Stackpole Books

External links 

 
 Current conditions at Blue Knob
 Blue Knob Ski Area

Allegheny Mountains
Mountains of Pennsylvania
Mountains of Bedford County, Pennsylvania